The 2011 World Senior Curling Championships were held at the Saint Paul Curling Club in St. Paul, Minnesota, United States from April 15 to 24, 2011. The event was held in conjunction with the 2011 World Mixed Doubles Curling Championship.

Canada swept the seniors event, winning both the men's and women's championships. Canada's Mark Johnson defeated the American hosts skipped by Geoff Goodland in an extra end, stealing a point to win 5–4, while Canada's Christine Jurgenson won a six-end game 9–2 over former world senior champion Ingrid Meldahl and her Swedish rink. The Australian rink under Hugh Millikin won their second consecutive bronze medal by defeating Denmark's Bent Kristoffersen with a tally of 8–5, while the Swiss rink under Chantal Forrer took the bronze medal with a 5-4 after a single in the last end to wrap up a tight game against the American hosts under Margie Smith.

Men

The men's tournament consisted of 21 teams playing in three groups of seven, an increase from last year's tournament, which consisted of 12 teams in two groups of six. The groups played a round-robin tournament within their own groups, and the top eight teams advanced to the quarterfinals and played a single-knockout round to determine the winner. The top eight teams included the top two teams from each group and two of the third-ranked teams among the groups.

Round-robin standings
Final round-robin standings

Playoffs

Bronze Medal Game
Saturday, April 23, 14:00

Gold Medal Game
Saturday, April 23, 14:00

Women

The women's tournament consisted of eleven teams playing a round robin tournament. The top four teams advanced to the semifinals and play a single-knockout round to determine the winner.

Round-robin standings
Final round-robin standings

Playoffs

Bronze Medal Game
Saturday, April 23, 14:00

Gold Medal Game
Saturday, April 23, 14:00

References
General

Specific

World Senior Curling Championships, 2011
World Senior Curling Championships
International curling competitions hosted by the United States
2011 in American sports
2011 in sports in Minnesota
Curling in Minnesota